Đỗ Anh Hàn (Hán tự: 杜英翰; ? – 791), known in Chinese as Du Yinghan (Wade–Giles: Tu Ying-han) was a chief in Phong, Tang Annan, in late 8th century who with Phùng Hưng led a revolt against the Tang dynasty during the Third Chinese domination of Vietnam in May 785, due to Chinese governor Gao Zhengping's doubling of taxes. 

The Chinese retook the region in 791 and had Du Yinghan killed.

References

Bibliography
 

Vietnamese revolutionaries
8th-century Vietnamese people
Tang dynasty rebels